Tlalocohyla is a genus of frogs in the family Hylidae, also known as rain treefrogs or Middle American yellow-bellied treefrogs. They occur in Middle America between Mexico and Costa Rica. This genus was created in 2005 following a major revision of the Hylidae. The five species in this genus were previously placed in the genus Hyla.

Species
There are five recognized species:

References

External links
  [web application]. Berkeley, California: Tlalocohyla. AmphibiaWeb, available at http://amphibiaweb.org/.

 
Hylinae
Amphibian genera
Frogs of North America
Taxa named by Jonathan A. Campbell
Taxa named by Darrel Frost